The women's pole vault event at the 2012 European Athletics Championships was held at the Helsinki Olympic Stadium on 28 and 30 June.

Medalists

Records

Schedule

Results

Qualification
Qualification: Qualification Performance 4.45 (Q) or at least 12 best performers advance to the final

Final

External links
 Qualification Results
 Final Results

Pole vault
Pole vault at the European Athletics Championships
2012 in women's athletics